Vernon Steele (born Arturo Romeo Antonietti; 18 September 1882 – 23 July 1955) was a Chilean-born British actor known for his appearances on the Broadway stage and in American films. He often played patrician young men in silent films. Steele was born in Santiago, Chile, the son of Daniel Antonietti, a professor of music, and his English wife, the former Grace Emma Bolton. Vernon Steele was christened Arturo Romeo Antonietti and his family eventually settled in London, England. His sister was the actress Hilda Anthony.

Filmography

 Hearts in Exile (1915) as Paul Pavloff (film debut)
 The Vampire (1915) as Robert Sterling
 Her Great Match (1915) as Prince Adolph
 The Stubbornness of Geraldine (1915)
 The Supreme Sacrifice (1916)  as Reverend Philip Morton
 Silks and Satins (1916) as Jacques Desmond
 Little Lady Eileen (1916) as Stanley Churchill/Sir George Churchill
 Polly of the Circus (1917) as John Douglas the Minister
 Bab's Matinee Idol (1917) as Adrian Egleston
 Fields of Honor (1918) as Robert Vorhis
 The Panther Woman (1918) as Beverly Peale
 The Eternal Magdalene (1919) as The Preacher
 The Firing Line (1919) as John Garret 'Garry' Hamil III
 The Witness for the Defense (1919) as Dick Hazelwood
 The Phantom Honeymoon (1919) as Captain Bob Tidewater
 The Mind the Paint Girl (1919) as Lord Francombe
 Human Desire (1919) as Jasper Norton
 His House in Order (1920) as Hillary Jesson
 The Highest Bidder (1921) as Hastings
 Out of the Chorus (1921) as Ross Van Beekman
 Beyond Price (1921) as Philip Marrio
 A Wonderful Wife (1922) as Alaric Lewin
 When the Devil Drives (1922) as Robert Taylor
 For the Defense (1922) as Christopher Armstrong
 The Hands of Nara (1922) as Adam Pine
 The Girl Who Ran Wild (1922) as The Schoolmaster
 Thelma (1922) as Sir Phillip Errington
 The Danger Point (1922) as Duncan Phelps
 Temptation (1923) as John Hope
 Alice Adams (1923) as Arthur Russell
 What Wives Want (1923) as Austin Howard
 Forgive and Forget (1923) as Ronnie Sears
 The Wanters (1923) as Tom Armstrong
 Discontented Husbands (1924) as Jack Ballard
 The House of Youth (1924) as Rhodes Winston
 Big News (1929) as Reporter
 The King's Vacation (1933) as Mac Barstow
 The Silk Express (1933) as Dr. Harold Rolph
 Design for Living (1933) as Douglas' First Manager (uncredited)
 Where Sinners Meet (1934) as Saunders - the Chauffeur
 The Great Flirtation (1934) as Bigelow
 Bulldog Drummond Strikes Back (1934) as Wedding Guest (uncredited)
 Bonnie Scotland (1935) as Col. Gregor McGregor
 Te quiero con locura (1935) as Dr. Preston
 I Found Stella Parish (1935) as Slave in Play (uncredited)
 No matarás (1935)
 Captain Blood (1935) as King James
 Dracula's Daughter (1936) as Squires (uncredited)
 Lloyd's of London (1936) as Sir Thomas Lawrence
 Time Out for Romance (1937) as Count Michael Montaine
 Step Lively, Jeeves! (1937) as Lord Fenton (uncredited)
 Kidnapped (1938) as Captain
 Flight to Fame (1938) as Officer (uncredited)
 North of the Yukon (1939) as RCMP Insp. Wylie
 The Witness Vanishes (1939) as Nigel Partridge
 Mrs. Miniver (1942) as Glee Club Member (uncredited)
 Riders of the Northwest Mounted (1943) as Captain Blair (uncredited)
 They Were Expendable (1945) as Army Doctor
 The Lone Wolf in London (1947) as Sir John Klemscott
 To the Ends of the Earth (1948) as Commissioner Lionel Hadley (uncredited)
 Joan of Arc (1948) as Boy's Father (uncredited)
 Madame Bovary (1949) as Priest (final film)

References

External links

1882 births
1955 deaths
English male film actors
Chilean male silent film actors
Male actors from Santiago
Chilean emigrants to the United Kingdom
20th-century English male actors
Male actors from London
British emigrants to the United States
Chilean people of English descent